KMHA (91.3 FM, "Alternative 91") is a radio station licensed to serve Four Bears, North Dakota.  This station is owned by Fort Berthold Communications Enterprises. It airs a Variety format including programming from Native Public Media.

The station was assigned the KMHA call letters by the Federal Communications Commission on May 10, 1982.

References

External links

MHA
Native American radio
McKenzie County, North Dakota
Mandan, Hidatsa, and Arikara Nation